Fairfax may refer to:

Places

United States
 Fairfax, California
 Fairfax Avenue, a major thoroughfare in Los Angeles, California
 Fairfax District, Los Angeles, California, centered on Fairfax Avenue
 Fairfax, Georgia
 Fairfax, Indiana
 Fairfax, Iowa
 Fairfax District (Kansas City, Kansas), an industrial area
 Fairfax, Minnesota
 Fairfax, Missouri
 Fairfax, Ohio, a village in Hamilton County
 Fairfax, Cleveland, Ohio, a neighborhood
 Fairfax, Highland County, Ohio
 Fairfax, Oklahoma
 Fairfax, South Carolina
 Fairfax, South Dakota
 Fairfax, Vermont, a New England town
 Fairfax (CDP), Vermont, the main village in the town
 Fairfax, Virginia, an independent city
 Fairfax County, Virginia, surrounding the city of Fairfax
 Fairfax Station, Virginia
 Fairfax, West Virginia
 Fairfax Stone Historical Monument State Park, West Virginia

Elsewhere
 Division of Fairfax, an electoral district in the Australian House of Representatives, in Queensland

People 
 Fairfax (name)
 Lord Fairfax of Cameron
 Viscount Fairfax of Emley

Other uses 
 Fairfax Academy, a secondary school in Sutton Coldfield, England
 Fairfax (White Pine, Tennessee), a mansion on the US National Register of Historic Places
 Fairfax University, a former unaccredited distance-learning institution
 University of Fairfax, an institution of higher education actually located in Vienna, Virginia, near Fairfax, Virginia
 Hellespont Fairfax, the largest double-hulled supertanker
 Fairfax Media, a defunct Australian-based media company focusing on newspapers
 Fairfax Financial, a Canadian-based financial services holding company
 General Motors Fairfax Assembly Plant, Kansas City, Kansas
 Fairfax House, a Georgian town-house, now a museum, in York, England
 Fairfax Christian School, a Christian school in Vienna, Virginia
 Fairfax (TV series), a 2021 animation TV show
 English ship Fairfax (1650), an English frigate, destroyed by fire in 1653
 English ship Fairfax (1653), an English frigate built to replace the 1650 ship of the same name

See also
 Fairfax High School (disambiguation)